Catherine Keipes (born 11 July 1985) is a Luxembourger footballer who plays as a goalkeeper for Dames Ligue 1 club SC Ell and the Luxembourg women's national team.

Keipes previously played on the club level at Racing FC Union Luxembourg, AS Wincrange, FC Blo-Wäiss Itzig, FC CeBra 01 and SC Bettembourg Féminine.

International career
She played her first game on 18 November 2006 in the first official international match of the Luxembourg's women's senior team against Slovakia.

References

1985 births
Living people
Women's association football goalkeepers
Luxembourgian women's footballers
Luxembourg women's international footballers